Jhalak Dikhhla Jaa 9 is the ninth season of the dance reality show, Jhalak Dikhhla Jaa. It premiered on 30 July 2016 on Colors. The season was hosted by Manish Paul and judged by Jacqueline Fernandez, Karan Johar, Ganesh Hegde and Farah Khan. The season ran from 30 July 2016 to 21 January 2017. This season's winner was Teriya Magar.

Elimination and Voting
Jhalak Dikhhla Jaa has no audience voting in this season. Eviction is based on two specific criteria: judges' scores and the live studio audience scores. In semi finale, it was announced that audience can vote for the winner. Voting lines were open only for five days. Thus, now the elimination is done right in the end of the episode, unlike the previous seasons where elimination would be done in the beginning of next week's episode.

Contestants Status

Contestants & Choreographers

The show started with 12 couples. In 8 October episode, 5 WildCard entries were introduced by Farah Khan (who too joined the show as a judge).

 Teriya Magar and Aryan Patra - (wildcard entry)- Eliminated 8th on 22 October 2016, Re-entered as wild card entry again on 26 November 2016. Emerged as the winner of the series on 21 January 2017.
 Salman Yusuff Khan and Aishwarya Radhakrishnan, declared the first runner-up couple on 21 January 2017.
 Shantanu Maheshwari and Alisha Singh, emerged as the second runners-up couple on 21 January 2017.
 Siddharth Nigam and Vaishnavi Patil - (WildCard Entry), eliminated on 14 January 2017
 Dwayne Bravo and Bhavna Purohit - (WildCard Entry), quit on 14 January 2017
Swasti Nitya and Preetjot Singh - (WildCard Entry), eliminated on 19 December 2016
 Karishma Tanna and Rajit Dev, eliminated on 10 December 2016
 Shakti Arora and Suchitra Sawant, eliminated on 26 November 2016
 Spandan Chaturvedi and Hardik - (wildcard), eliminated on 19 November 2016
 Nora Fatehi and Cornel Rodrigues, eliminated on 12 November 2016
 Gracy Goswami and Sachin - (WildCard Entry), eliminated on 5 November 2016
 Surveen Chawla and Sanam Johar, eliminated on 1 October 2016
 Arjun Bijlani and Bhavna Khanduja, eliminated on 1 October 2016
 Helly Shah and Jai Kumar Nair, eliminated on 3 September 2016
 Sidhant Gupta and Pranalini Atul/Sneha/Afiya, eliminated on 3 September 2016
 Chef Harpal Singh Sokhi and Bhavna Purohit, eliminated on 27 August 2016
Priyanka Shah and Poonam Shah, eliminated on 22 August 2016
 Gaurav Gera as Chutki and Diwakar Nayal, eliminated on 13 August 2016

Score Chart
'

Red numbers indicates the lowest score.
Green numbers indicates the highest score.
 indicates the winning couple.
 indicates the runner-up couple.
 indicates the third-place couple.
 indicates the fourth-place couple.
 indicates the couple eliminated that week.
 indicates the returning couple that finished in the bottom three.
 indicates the returning couple that finished in the bottom two.

Guests

References

External links 
 Jhalak Dikhhla Jaa 9 at Colors TV

2016 Indian television seasons
Jhalak Dikhhla Jaa seasons
2017 Indian television seasons
Colors TV original programming